The Journal of Chromatographic Science (JCS) is a peer reviewed academic journal of chromatography. It is published by Oxford University Press. The Journal focuses on research papers describing practical and preparative applications and analytical methods relevant to a broad range of laboratory work. The editors-in-chief are Huba Kalász and Neil Danielson. According to the Journal Citation Reports, the journal has a 2020 impact factor of 1.618.

See also
Journal of Analytical Toxicology
Toxicological Sciences

References

External links

Oxford University Press academic journals
Chemistry journals